Vít is a Czech masculine given name, the Czech rendition of the Latin name Vitus, popularized through the Christian tradition of Saint Vitus (290–302).

Notable people with the name include:

 Vít Baránek (born 1974) Czech football player
 Vít Bárta (born 1973) Czech politician
 Vít Beneš (born 1988) Czech football player
 Vít Christov (born 1996) Czech ice hockey player
 Vít Fousek Jr. (born 1940) Czech cross-country skier
 Vít Fousek Sr. (1913–1990) Czech cross-country skier
 Vít Jedlička (born 1983) Czech politician
 Vít Jonák (born 1991) Czech ice hockey player
 Vít Kárník (1926–1994) Czech geophysicist
 Vít Kaňkovský (born 1970) Czech politician
 Vit Klemes (1932–2010) Czech-Canadian hydrologist
 Vít Nemrava (born 1996) Czech football player
 Vít Přindiš (born 1989) Czech slalom canoeist
 Vít Štětina (born 1989) Czech football player
 Vít Vrtělka (born 1982) Czech football player
 Vít Zouhar (born 1966) Czech musician

Czech masculine given names